Wassertorplatz is a neighbourhood in Berlin, Germany.

References

Friedrichshain-Kreuzberg